Bastille Day is the common name for the French National Day, celebrated on 14 July each year.

Bastille Day may also refer to:
Bastille Day (1933 film), a French romantic comedy by René Clair 
Bastille Day (2016 film), a film starring Idris Elba
"Bastille Day" (Battlestar Galactica), an episode of Battlestar Galactica
"Bastille Day" (song), a song by Rush

See also
Bastille (disambiguation)
Bastille Day attack, a list of attacks
Bastille Day Event, a solar flare on July 14, 2000
Bastille Day Military Parade, a French military parade held on Bastille Day